Richard Sadler (born March 18, 1947, in Montreal, Quebec, Canada) is a producer, scenarist and film director.

Biography

Filmography

As a producer 
 1984 : The Gunrunner directed by Nardo Castillo
 1989 : How to Make Love to a Negro Without Getting Tired (Comment faire l'amour avec un nègre sans se fatiguer) directed by Jacques W. Benoit
 1991 : Scream of Stone (Cerro Torre: Schrei aus Stein) directed by Werner Herzog
 1992 : Coyote directed by Richard Ciupka
 1992 : Le mirage directed by Jean-Claude Guiguet
 1994 : Louis 19, King of the Airwaves (Louis 19, le roi des ondes) directed by Michel Poulette
 1996 : Caboose directed by Richard Roy
 1997 : Le ciel est à nous directed by Graham Guit
 1998 : Sucre amer directed by Christian Lara
 1999 : EdTV de Ron Howard
 2001 : Karmen Geï directed by Joseph Gaï Ramaka
 2003 : Là-haut, un roi au-dessus des nuages directed by Pierre Schoendoerffer
 2005 : Louise directed by Jacques Renard

As a scenarist 
 1969 : Valérie (Tendre et sensuelle Valérie) directed by Denis Héroux
 1989 : How to Make Love to a Negro Without Getting Tired (Comment faire l'amour avec un nègre sans se fatiguer) directed by Jacques W. Benoit
 1992 : Coyote directed by Richard Ciupka

As a director 
 1975 : Le Monde s'en vient à Québec

Awards and nominations

Awards 
 1994 - Golden Reel Award (Highest Canadian box office) for Louis 19, King of the Airwaves (Louis 19, le roi des ondes)

Nominations 
 1990 - Genie Best screenplay adaptation How to Make Love to a Negro Without Getting Tired (Comment faire l'amour avec un nègre sans se fatiguer)
 1994 - Genie Best motion picture Louis 19, King of the Airwaves (Louis 19, le roi des ondes)

References

External links 
 

1947 births
Living people
Film producers from Quebec
Canadian male screenwriters
Writers from Montreal
20th-century Canadian screenwriters
20th-century Canadian male writers
Canadian screenwriters in French